"Bounce Out with That" is a song by American rapper YBN Nahmir. The track was released on January 24, 2018, and peaked at number one on the Bubbling Under Hot 100 chart and at number 76 on the Canadian Hot 100.

The track was certified Gold on August 16, 2018, and Platinum on December 14, 2018.

Music video 
The music video was released alongside the track on January 24, 2018, with guest appearances from the likes of PnB Rock, Fatboy SSE, and more. Lindsey India of XXL called the music video "turnt up".

Critical reception 
Mitch Findlay of HotNewHipHop called the song "a solid introduction for those looking to find out what YBN Nahmir is about", and said the instrumental was "bouncy".

Charts

Certifications

References 

2018 singles
2018 songs
YBN Nahmir songs